Cockle may refer to:

 Cockle (bivalve), an edible, marine bivalve mollusc
 Lolium temulentum (also cockle), an annual plant of the family Poaceae
 Berwick cockle, a white-coloured sweet with red stripes
 Cockle, a codename for the folding kayaks used in World War II
 Cockles (TV series), a 1984 British television series
 Cockles (as in "warm the cockles of someone's heart"), the ventricles of the heart

People with the surname
 Doug Cockle (born 1970), American actor and director
 Dudley Cockle (1907–1986), English cricketer and Royal Air Force airman
 Jackie Cockle (born 1950), British animation specialist
 James Cockle (1819–1895), English lawyer and mathematician
 John Cockle (1908–1966), Australian politician

See also
 Cockle Bay (disambiguation)
 Cockle Creek (disambiguation)
 Cockleshell (disambiguation)
 Cocles (disambiguation)
 Cockley (disambiguation)
 Cocklebur